The x Tour (pronounced "Multiply Tour") was the second world concert tour by English singer-songwriter and musician, Ed Sheeran, in support of his second studio album, × (pronounced "multiply") (2014). The tour began in Osaka, Japan on 6 August 2014, and continued through Europe, the Americas, Oceania and Asia until 12 December 2015, where the tour ended in New Zealand. Sheeran planned 180 shows.  In June 2015, the singer announced a documentary would be filmed during the tour's three sold-out dates, 10–12 July 2015, at 80,000-person capacity Wembley Stadium.

Background
Throughout 2013, Sheeran supported Taylor Swift on her North American Red Tour, as well as performing throughout the show itself. He also is featured on her single, "Everything Has Changed", which was promoted at the Summertime Ball and the final of Britain's Got Talent. While touring, he began recording his second studio album, ×. The album was preceded by the lead single, "Sing", which reached number one in the UK. The album, released on 20 June 2014, received critical acclaim, and Sheeran performed at series of festivals in 2014, including Glastonbury Festival, T in the Park and Southside Festival. On 14 April 2014, following a performance on Saturday Night Live, Sheeran announced his first ever North American arena tour. Beginning in Seattle, the 15-date tour would travel all around North America. Due to demand, three dates were added to the tour (one date at the SAP Center and at the Staples Center in Los Angeles).

During the 2015 leg of the X Tour, Ed Sheeran chose to use a Fender Stratocaster loaned to him by British contemporary artist Teddy McDonald.  The guitar known as Green T featuring graphics by the artist was played in 18 countries and used for the songs requiring an electric guitar including "Thinking Out Loud".  Green T was returned to Teddy McDonald at the end of the X Tour and later auctioned by Bonhams for £12,500 (Dec 2015). https://www.bonhams.com/auctions/22818/lot/179/

The documentary movie Jumpers for Goalposts: Live at Wembley Stadium shot at Wembley Stadium at the end of the X Tour features the graffiti'd Fender Stratocaster Ed Sheeran commissioned as a collaboration between New York street art pioneer John Crash Matos and Teddy McDonald.  Known as the 'Crash x Teddy M' Stratocaster, the guitar features the debut of the Teddy M Heart design and Crash's signature eye symbol.  GQ magazine featured a full page article on the 'Crash x Teddy M' Stratocaster in their July 2015 edition.

According to Pollstar, the X Tour was the 43rd highest-grossing tour of 2014, with 667,066 tickets sold and US$33.4 million grossed. The next year, the X Tour became the seventh highest-grossing tour of 2015, with 1,823,410 tickets sold and a gross of US$117.3 million, accumulating a total of US$150.7 million grossed.

The support acts were: Rudimental, Rixton, Foy Vance, Kodaline and Christina Perri.

Set list
This set list is representative of the show on August 27, 2014. It does not represent all concerts for the duration of the tour.

 "I'm a Mess"
 "Lego House"
 "Don't"
 "Drunk"
 "Take It Back"
 "One"
 "Bloodstream"
 "Tenerife Sea"
 "Afire Love"
 "Runaway"
 "Thinking Out Loud"
 "Give Me Love"
 "I See Fire"
Encore
"You Need Me, I Don't Need You"
 "The A Team"
 "Chasing Cars"
 "Sing"

Tour dates

Notes

References

2014 concert tours
2015 concert tours
Ed Sheeran concert tours